The Panasonic Lumix DC-G9 is a Micro Four Thirds mirrorless interchangeable lens camera body announced by Panasonic at the end of 2017.

The Panasonic G9 is a more still-centric variant of the Panasonic Lumix DC-GH5: it can shoot up to 20 pictures per second in full resolution and with continuous focusing, interruption-free live view as well as raw recording. Furthermore, it shows a larger viewfinder image.

The G9 offers an 80-Megapixel high-resolution mode, where eight 20-Megapixel-shots are taken with shifted image sensor. The image stabiliser is used for shifting the image sensor in 1.7-micrometer-steps, which are equal to the half of the pixel pitch of about 3.3 micrometers. This mode is limited to use with stationary or nearly stationary subjects, unless artistic effects are desired.

The DC-G9 won the Camera Grand Prix 2018 (japanese) Editors award.

References

External links 

G9
Cameras introduced in 2017